Taylorsville is a census-designated place (CDP) in German Township, Bartholomew County, in the U.S. state of Indiana. The population was 919 at the 2010 census.  It is part of the Columbus, Indiana metropolitan statistical area.

History
Taylorsville was originally called Herod, and under the latter name was platted in 1849. The post office at Taylorsville has been in operation since 1852.

Geography
Taylorsville is located at  (39.296284, -85.949220).

Demographics

As of the census of 2000, there were 936 people, 356 households and 280 families residing in the CDP. The racial makeup of the CDP was 96.69% White, 1.82% African American, 0.11% Pacific Islander, 0.53% from other races, and 0.85% from two or more races. Hispanic or Latino of any race were 1.28% of the population.

There were 356 households, out of which 33.1% had children under the age of 18 living with them, 65.2% were married couples living together, 10.1% had a female householder with no husband present, and 21.3% were non-families. 19.7% of all households were made up of individuals, and 7.0% had someone living alone who was 65 years of age or older. The average household size was 2.63 and the average family size was 3.00.

In the CDP, the population was spread out, with 25.3% under the age of 18, 9.6% from 18 to 24, 27.1% from 25 to 44, 26.8% from 45 to 64, and 11.1% who were 65 years of age or older. The median age was 37 years. For every 100 females, there were 97.9 males. For every 100 females age 18 and over, there were 96.9 males.

The median income for a household in the CDP was $36,923, and the median income for a family was $45,000. Males had a median income of $38,207 versus $21,467 for females. The per capita income for the CDP was $15,566. About 7.2% of families and 9.2% of the population were below the poverty line, including 12.2% of those under age 18 and none of those age 65 or over.

References

Census-designated places in Bartholomew County, Indiana
Census-designated places in Indiana
Populated places established in 1849
1849 establishments in Indiana